Oopsis keiensis is a species of beetle in the family Cerambycidae. It was described by Breuning in 1970.

References

Oopsis
Beetles described in 1970